The Labis railway station is a Malaysian train station located at and named after the town of Labis, Segamat District, Johor. The station provides KTM Intercity train services.

The Labis old railway station was closed on 29 September 2021 for giving way to the Electrified Double Tracking Project between Gemas and Johor Bahru. This was replaced with the Labis temporary railway station on the same day of the closure of the old station. The old station building was demolished on the following day after its closure (30 September 2021).

See also
 Rail transport in Malaysia

External links
 Labis KTM Railway Station

KTM ETS railway stations
Segamat District
Railway stations in Johor